Mathias Malzieu (born 1974), the lead singer of the French band Dionysos, co-founded the group in 1993 when he lived in Valence in Drôme (Auvergne-Rhône-Alpes). Three of his school-friends (Eric Serra Tosio, Michael Ponton and Guillaume Garidel), comprised the original band membership.

Books

Malzieu has written the following books:

 38 mini westerns avec des fantômes (2002)
 Maintenant qu'il fait tout le temps nuit sur toi (2005)
 La mécanique du cœur (2007); English translation titled The Boy with the Cuckoo-Clock Heart released in September 2009
 Métamorphose en bord de ciel (2011)
 Le Plus Petit Baiser Jamais Recensé (2013)
 Journal d'un vampire en pyjama (2016); English translation titled Diary of a Vampire in Pyjamas released in May 2017

More recently :

 Une sirène à Paris 
 Le dérèglement joyeux de la métrique amoureuse

Movies
Together with Stephanie Berla, he directed the movie "Jack and the Cuckoo-Clock Heart" (2013).

"Une sirène à Paris" (2020)

Personal life

Malzieu's partner , Daria Nelson, is a French photographer.

References

Living people
1974 births
Musicians from Montpellier
French songwriters
Male songwriters
French rock singers
French singer-songwriters
French rock guitarists
French male guitarists
21st-century French singers
21st-century guitarists
21st-century French male singers
French male singer-songwriters